Trolls: Holiday in Harmony is a 2021 computer-animated musical Christmas special that premiered on NBC on November 26, 2021. Based on DreamWorks Animation's Trolls franchise, this was the second one to be based on the franchise following Trolls Holiday, and is written and directed by Sean Charmatz and Tim Heitz.

A majority of the cast from the two movies reprise their respective roles, including Anna Kendrick, Justin Timberlake, Rachel Bloom, and Kenan Thompson; likewise, Lauren Mayhew and Megan Hilty reprise their respective roles as Val Thundershock and Holly Darlin' from TrollsTopia. The special features famous actress and comedian Carol Burnett as the voice of Wind Breeze.

Plot 
After the events of Trolls World Tour, During the holiday season, Poppy explains to Branch that she is planning a gift exchange, with baskets filled with invitations; each one has the name of another Troll in Troll Kingdom. The Troll has to buy a secret gift for that Troll and will meet in Pop Village in three days time to exchange gifts. Poppy and Branch deliver the baskets all around the kingdom before finishing in Pop Village. When they are done, they pick out the last cards and pull out each other's names, with Poppy excited to have pulled Branch's name and Branch horrified to have pulled Poppy's. Nervously, both part ways.

At Pop Village, Tiny Diamond grabs an invitation and pulls out his father's name "Guy Diamond". He does a rap, but finds it hard to rhyme with "Diamond", believing he has lost his flow. After a few failed attempts to find the perfect rhyme, Tiny heads to the top of a mountain to seek out the monks at the Cloud Temple. When he arrived, Tiny starts to meditate with the Clouds, who helped him realize that he just had to rhyme "daddy" and has his rap sorted.

Back in Pop Village, while Trolls are already gathering and busy, Poppy finishes her touches of her gift to Branch, confident that she has it right. Meanwhile, Branch comes up with the idea for a machine that does Poppy's hair, but after getting her head measurements without her knowing, he sees her gift to him and runs back to his bunker. Panicking that his gift will not be enough, Branch goes over the top and builds his machine, adding more and more functions constantly. After he finishes, he tests out the machine and it explodes, sending him into space then back down to the village. When Tiny finds him on the ground, Branch believes he failed and tells him what happened. Tiny passes on the wisdom he just learnt and tells Branch to look through the clutter. While cleaning up the mess in his bunker, Branch finds a photo of him and Poppy and realizes what he must do.

During the gift swap, Poppy and Branch reveal they got each other's names. Branch presents Poppy with a scrapbook detailing all the events up until that day, which she finds wonderful, as it is only something he could give her. When Poppy opens her gift to Branch, it turns out to be empty, because she knew there was nothing good enough for him. Poppy and Branch hug as they realize they just need each other, and they and all the other Trolls start singing “Together Now”. As the song ends, Poppy and Branch go off on another balloon ride over Troll Kingdom, with Poppy kissing Branch on the cheek.

Cast 
 Anna Kendrick as Queen Poppy
 Justin Timberlake as Branch
 Rachel Bloom as Queen Barb
 Jenny Mermelstein as Delta Dawn
 Kunal Nayyar as Guy Diamond
 Kenan Thompson as Tiny Diamond
 Ron Funches as Cooper
 Anderson .Paak as Prince Darnell
 Anthony Ramos as King Trollex
 Walt Dohrn as Cloud Guy and Mr. Dinkles
 Ester Dean as Legsly
 Da'Vine Joy Randolph as Flowerface Balloon
 Carol Burnett as Wind Breeze
 Kylie Jenner as Penelepuff
 Travis Scott as Rhyme-a-saurus
 Lauren Mayhew as Val Thundershock
 Megan Hilty as Holly Darlin'
 ADR group provided by Carlos Alazraqui, Hudson D'Andrea, Terri Douglas, Yonas Kibreab, Arif Kinchen, Fred Tatasciore, Kari Wahlgren and Shonlalia White

Crew 
 Martin Handford - Special Thanks

Soundtrack 
A soundtrack featuring five songs from the special was released on November 26, 2021.

Release 
The special premiered on NBC on November 26, 2021 (Black Friday). It generated a live viewership of 1.845 million and a 0.35 rating. The total viewership after a week was 2.158 million and a rating of 0.44.

Home media
Trolls: Holiday in Harmony was released on Blu-Ray and DVD November 29, 2021 in the UK by Universal Pictures Home Entertainment (through Warner Bros. Home Entertainment).

It was also released on DVD and in a 2-pack Blu-ray bundled with Trolls Holiday on November 30, 2021 in the United States by Studio Distribution Services, LLC. (a joint venture between Universal and Warner Bros.)

References

External links
Official website

2020s American animated films
2020s American television specials
2020s animated television specials
2021 television specials
American Christmas television specials
Christmas television specials
DreamWorks Animation animated short films
Trolls (franchise)
Musical television specials
NBC television specials